Broadway Residence Hall is a postmodern dormitory at Columbia University in New York City. The building is commonly referred to by students as "Broadway". The building is nominally located at the corner of Broadway and 113th Street, though it shares its main entrance, which opens onto 114th Street, with Hogan Hall. Designed by Robert A.M. Stern Architects, it opened in 2000.  Originally supposed to blend with the redbrick McKim, Mead & White buildings of the Columbia campus, Broadway Hall's design was changed to placate neighbors who wished to see it blend with local apartment buildings. In addition to housing students, its lower levels are home to a hardware store and a branch of the New York Public Library system.

External links
Broadway Hall at Columbia Housing
Robert A. M. Stern's project page
Morningside Heights neighborhood page building profile
Housing the Columbia Community, lecture by Professor Andrew S. Dolkart on October 5, 1999
Home on the Heights: 100 Years of Housing at Columbia by Michael Foss, Columbia College Today, September 2005

Columbia University dormitories
University and college dormitories in the United States
Residential buildings completed in 2000
Broadway (Manhattan)
Morningside Heights, Manhattan